Ust-Udinsky District is an administrative district, one of the thirty-three in Irkutsk Oblast, Russia. Municipally, it is incorporated as Ust-Udinsky Municipal District. Its administrative center is the urban locality (a work settlement) of Ust-Uda. Population:  16,747 (2002 Census);  The population of Ust-Uda accounts for 36.0% of the district's total population.

References

Notes

Sources

Districts of Irkutsk Oblast